The Shack or The Hut (Spanish:La barraca) is a 1945 Mexican drama film directed by Roberto Gavaldón and starring Domingo Soler, Anita Blanch and Amparo Morillo. It is based on the 1898 novel of the same title by Vicente Blasco Ibáñez.

The film's art direction was by Francisco Marco Chillet and Vicente Petit.

Cast

References

Bibliography 
 Paulo Antonio Paranaguá. Mexican Cinema. British Film Institute, 1995.

External links 
 

1945 films
1945 drama films
Mexican drama films
1940s Spanish-language films
Films based on works by Vicente Blasco Ibáñez
Films directed by Roberto Gavaldón
Mexican black-and-white films
1940s Mexican films